The Electoral district of Town of Parramatta was an electorate of the partially elected New South Wales Legislative Council, created for the first elections for the Council in 1843,
at the time the principal residence of the Governor Sir Charles FitzRoy.
Polling took place at Parramatta. In 1856, the unicameral Legislative Council was abolished and replaced with an elected Legislative Assembly and an appointed Legislative Council. The district was represented by the Legislative Assembly Parramatta, the only electorate to have existed continuously since the first Legislative Assembly election in 1856.

Members

George Oakes went on to be one of two representatives for Parramatta in the new Legislative Assembly in 1856.

Election results

1843

1848

1851

See also
Members of the New South Wales Legislative Council, 1843–1851 and 1851-1856

References

Former electoral districts of New South Wales Legislative Council
1843 establishments in Australia
1856 disestablishments in Australia